is an interchange passenger railway station located in the city of Fukuchiyama, Kyoto Prefecture, Japan. It is jointly operated by the  West Japan Railway Company (JR West) and the private railway company Willer Trains (Kyoto Tango Railway).

Lines

Layout
The JR station consists of an elevated side platform and two elevated island platforms serving five tracks, with the station building underneath. The JR portion of the station has a Midori no Madoguchi staffed ticket office. The Kyoto Tango Railway portion has an island platform serving two tracks. The station is one of the 15 staffed stations operated by KTR. Limited express trains named "Tango Relay" arrive at and depart from the platform for the KTR Line.

Platforms

Adjacent stations

|-
!colspan=5|West Japan Railway Company (JR West)

|-
!colspan=5|Kyoto Tango Railway

Bus routes
West JR Bus, Kyoto Kotsu, Tango Kairiku Kostu, Osaka Bus and so on are operated.

North Exit

Following buses operated by Fukuchiyama City Community bus.

South Exit

History
Fukuchiyama Station opened on November 3, 1904. With the privatization of the Japan National Railways (JNR) on April 1, 1987, the station came under the aegis of the West Japan Railway Company.

Passenger statistics
In fiscal 2016, the JR West portion of the station was used by an average of 3,783 passengers daily.The KTR station was used by 1033 passengers during the same period.

Surrounding area
 Fukuchiyama Castle
 Fukuchiyama City Hall

See also
List of railway stations in Japan

References

External links

 JR West Station Official Site
KTR Official home page 

Railway stations in Japan opened in 1904
Railway stations in Kyoto Prefecture
Sanin Main Line
Fukuchiyama, Kyoto